Charles Andrew Gilman (February 9, 1833 – June 7, 1927) was a Republican Minnesota legislator, Speaker of the Minnesota House of Representatives, and the ninth Lieutenant Governor of Minnesota.

Life and career
Gilman was born in 1833 in Gilmanton, New Hampshire to Charles Gilman and Eliza Gilman (née Page). The Gilman family well established one in New England, with roots dating back to the 1630s. He attended school at Gilmanton Academy and later in East Andover, New Hampshire. After a brief career teaching in several different New Hampshire towns, he relocated to Sauk Rapids, Minnesota in 1855.

Gilman quickly became involved in local politics and became register of deeds and county auditor for Benton County, Minnesota. On January 1, 1857 he married Hester Cronk, a native of Belleville, Ontario. In 1861 he was named the head of the General Land Office in St. Cloud, Minnesota and relocated there. He was later reappointed to the same office in 1866 and again in 1869. During this time Gilman also explored the timber and mining industries, pursuing interests in Minnesota as well as Ontario and further west.

In 1867 Gilman was elected to the Minnesota Senate, serving until 1871. He was later elected to the Minnesota House in 1875 and served until 1880 (including as Speaker of the Minnesota House from 1878 to 1879). During both terms, Gilman was heavily involved in legislation surrounding railroads and supported the development of the Great Northern Railway (U.S.). He also won election as a Republican despite his district leaning heavily Democratic.

After serving in the legislature Gilman became Lieutenant Governor under Governors John S. Pillsbury and Lucius Hubbard from January 10, 1880 to January 4, 1887. He unsuccessfully ran for the Republican nomination for governor in 1886 and 1888. From 1894 to 1899 he was the Minnesota State Librarian.

Gilman later served one more term in the House, from 1915 to 1917. He died on June 7, 1927 in Saint Cloud, Minnesota. He is buried in Benton County Cemetery in Sauk Rapids, Minnesota.

References

1833 births
1927 deaths
People from Gilmanton, New Hampshire
Politicians from St. Cloud, Minnesota
Gilman family of New Hampshire
Lieutenant Governors of Minnesota
Republican Party Minnesota state senators
Speakers of the Minnesota House of Representatives
Republican Party members of the Minnesota House of Representatives
19th-century American politicians
20th-century American politicians